The Allen River is a river in the West Coast district of the South Island of New Zealand. The river has left and right branches for half its length, and the right branch has a major tributary stream in a valley between the two branches.

See also
List of rivers of New Zealand

References
Land Information New Zealand - Search for Place Names
 Topographical map NZMS 260 sheet: M28

Buller District
Rivers of the West Coast, New Zealand
Rivers of New Zealand